The Canadian Farmer is a Canadian current affairs television miniseries which aired on CBC Television in 1959.

Premise
This series temporarily replaced Explorations and featured reports on the state of Canadian farming.

Scheduling
This half-hour miniseries was broadcast on Thursday at 10:00 p.m. (Eastern time) as follows:

 4 June 1959: "Farmer on a Tiger", on government policies and farming problems
 11 June 1959: "Cow on a Tightrope", describing the process by which milk is provided to consumers
 18 June 1959: "Road to Rosetown", which looks at how farming communities have declined as transportation systems have upgraded

References

External links
 

CBC Television original programming
1959 Canadian television series debuts
1959 Canadian television series endings
1950s Canadian television news shows
1950s Canadian television miniseries
Black-and-white Canadian television shows